Bardney is a village and civil parish in the West Lindsey district of Lincolnshire, England. The population of the civil parish was 1,643 at the 2001 census increasing to 1,848 (including Southrey) at the 2011 census.


History

Two Roman artefacts have been found in Bardney; a gemstone and a coin. Nearby villages show evidence of Roman settlement, particularly Potterhanworth Booths and Branston Booths.

The place-name is Old English in origin, and means "island of a man called Bearda". It occurs in the Anglo-Saxon Chronicle, under the year 716, as "Bearddanig", and in Domesday Book as "Bardenai".

Once the site of a mediaeval abbey, ruined in Henry VIII's dissolution of the monasteries, agricultural improvement made the village prosperous in the 19th century. Improved transport, first on the River and then the arrival of several railways caused considerable expansion between the traditional centre of the village and the former riverside settlement of Bardney Ferry, where in 1894 the ferry was replaced by the present bridge. A British Sugar factory, built in 1927, survived the closure of the railways but ceased processing on 9 February 2001.

Bardney Abbey
Bardney Abbey was founded before 679, perhaps as double house of monks and nuns, and perhaps as a Minster. It was destroyed by the Danes circa 860. Refounded 1087 as a Priory, it became a Benedictine Abbey in 1115, and was dissolved in 1538.

Lost villages
Near the Abbey is the site of the Deserted Medieval Village of Butyate, which was demolished in 1959, and converted to farmland.

There is another abandoned village associated with the former chapels of St Lawrence and St Andrew, north of modern Bardney.

Transport
The river Witham has been used for commercial shipping since time immemorial, but was straightened and improved many times including in 1753 and 1812. A straight course (new cut) was made at Bardney and the lock built in 1770 was re-built in 1865.

In 1870, Bardney had a station which was a junction for the Branch Line to Louth via Wragby and the Lincolnshire Loop Line. The Louth to Bardney Line closed as well as the Loop Line in 1970 although the section north of Wragby closed prior to 1958–1969. The station building survives and is a listed building. The route of the old railway has been converted into a cycle-track, known as Water Rail Way, which follows the river between Lincoln and Boston. The name of the cycle track refers to the river, the railway, and a wetland bird found in the area, the water rail.

Great Western Express Festival
In 1972 the area was host to the Great Western Express Festival, a four-day pop concert (also known as the Bardney Festival). Funded by Lord Harlech and the actor Stanley Baker (amongst others) it attracted 30,000 people to the venue, held at the nearby Tupholme Abbey ruins. Amongst the artistes playing were Roxy Music and Status Quo and, for two nights running, the Rory Gallagher Band. Despite its popularity the show lost money due mainly to bad weather which blighted the event.

Community
The parish church of St Lawrence is part of the Bardney Group of the Deanery of Horncastle in the Diocese of Lincoln. There is also an active Methodist chapel; the current minister is the Rev'd Gordon Davis.

The modern primary school, Bardney Church of England and Methodist Primary School, was opened in 1983. It replaced two earlier schools merged in 1964.

The village has pre-school facilities, including Bardney Mother and Toddler Group which meets at the Methodist Hall, a butcher's shop, a general store and two public houses.

A skate park is planned to be erected by April 2014.

Bardney Gala, held every year on August Bank Holiday Sunday, is a traditional Gala. The event consists of crafts, trade and community stands, funfair rides, bar and BBQ, sports, children's races, car boot sales, classic vehicles, and an Exemption Dog Show.

Administration
Originally part of the Wraggoe Wapentake, and of the Lincoln poor law union in the Parts of Lindsey, the parish is now part of West Lindsey District, and Lincolnshire County Council.

The civil parish has become part of a group that consists of Bardney, Apley and Stainfield parishes. The villages of Southrey and Kingthorpe are also included.

The 2011 electoral arrangements are:
 West Lindsey District Council, Bardney ward councillor: Ian Fleetwood
 Lincolnshire County Council councillor: Ian Fleetwood
 Westminster, Gainsborough constituency Member of Parliament: Edward Leigh
 European Parliament, East Midlands MEPs: Derek Clark, Roger Helmer, Glenis Willmott, Emma McClarkin, Bill Newton Dunn.

Sister city
 (fr)  –  Bazouges-sur-le-Loir

Geography and ecology

Bardney lies between 7 and 17 metres above sea level, on the edge of the present-day Lincolnshire Fens, but its name indicates that before the fens were drained for agriculture (from the 17th century onwards) it was surrounded with wet fenland. Nowadays the Lincolnshire Fens are mostly unflooded, very flat and very productive arable farmland. Wildlife observed on the fens near Bardney includes barn owl, red fox and hemlock.

Bardney is surrounded by ancient woodlands composed primarily of lime trees, known collectively as Bardney Limewoods. Lime forests are rare in the United Kingdom, where oak is generally the dominant climatic climax species. The flora of the woodlands is indicative of ancient woodland, including Allium ursinum, Hyacinthoides non-scripta and Circaea lutetiana, as well as several species of wild orchids. Wildlife in the limewoods includes deer, Eurasian jay, European hornet and purple hairstreak butterfly.

In 2017 a white-billed diver was observed on the River Witham at Bardney. This is an Arctic species which seldom visits the United Kingdom.

See also
The Fens
RAF Bardney
Tupholme
Bardney Abbey
River Witham
National Cycle Route 1#Norwich to Lincoln
Louth to Bardney Line
Lincolnshire Loop Line
Bardney railway station
Bardney Limewoods

References

External links

 Location map for Bardney and the Abbey
National cycle route 1
Environment agency flood planning
Bardney, Genuki.org.UK
Heritage centre contact details
Private web site of Lincolnshire railway photos, including several involving Bardney
National nature reserve: Bardney Limewoods
 

Villages in Lincolnshire
Civil parishes in Lincolnshire
West Lindsey District